Midnight Garden is a collaborative album between Brad Roberts of the Crash Test Dummies and singer-songwriter Rob Morsberger.

Track listing

2012 albums